William Race (5 February 1896 – 1972) was an English footballer who scored 10 goals from 59 appearances in the Football League playing on the wing for Darlington and Hartlepools United in the 1920s and 1930s. He also played non-league football for clubs including Spennymoor United and Horden Colliery Welfare. According to the Derby Daily Telegraph in 1927, he was "small, yet makes for this with an elusive trickiness".

References

1896 births
1972 deaths
People from Horden
Footballers from County Durham
English footballers
Association football outside forwards
Spennymoor United F.C. players
Darlington F.C. players
Hartlepool United F.C. players
Darlington Town F.C. players
English Football League players
Date of death missing
Place of death missing